Caleb Fairly (born February 19, 1987) is an American former professional road racing cyclist, who rode professionally between 2011 and 2016 for the , ,  and  teams.

Personal
Born in Amarillo, Texas, United States, Fairly resides in Colorado Springs, Colorado, United States. During the season, he resides in Girona, Catalonia, Spain.

Career

Fairly announced his retirement ahead of the 2016 Tour of California, with the race being his last.

Major results
Sources:

2006
 10th Road race, National Under-23 Road Championships
2008
 National Under-23 Road Championships
4th Time trial
7th Road race
2009
 4th Time trial, National Under-23 Road Championships
 6th Overall Olympia's Tour
2010
 1st  Overall Tour of the Bahamas
1st Stage 3
 1st Tour of the Battenkill
 3rd Giro di Toscana
2013
 6th Road race, National Road Championships

References

External links

 
 
 Caleb Fairly at CyclingBase.com
 
 

1987 births
Living people
American male cyclists